Manufacturing Business Technology is a website owned by Advantage Business Media. The site serves the information needs of information technology professionals involved in production, supply chain management, and operations within a manufacturing enterprise. MBT's mission is inform its readers about the critical issues related to IT professionals and the manufacturing industry.

The website's editor is Anna K. Wells, and the site's editorial director is Jeff Reinke. MBT'''s editorial offices are located at Advantage Business Media's Madison, Wis. branch.
 
Established in 1984, Manufacturing Business Technology publishes daily breaking news about the manufacturing and IT industries. MBT also distributes the Mid-Week Report, a weekly e-newsletter that offers news, editorial, and product content similar to what's found on the website. Common topics of news and editorial pieces include automation integration, network security, software implementation and use, supply chain awareness, product lifecycle management, software and system vendor selection, systems integration, validating return on investment, identifying and eliminating inefficiencies in terms of workflow and software performance, and training to understand a platform's full potential.

The Manufacturing Business Technology site was re-launched by Advantage Business Media in April, 2010. Some of Advantage Business Media's future plans for MBT'' include the launch of a daily e-newsletter and a monthly online "magazine," which will feature fresh content not seen on the site or in e-newsletters.

External links
 Manufacturing Business Technology website

Online magazines published in the United States
Magazines established in 1984
Magazines published in Wisconsin
Mass media in Madison, Wisconsin